Bebearia luteola is a butterfly in the family Nymphalidae. It is found in the Democratic Republic of the Congo (Mongala, Uele, north Kivu, Tshopo and Lualaba).

References

Butterflies described in 1908
luteola
Endemic fauna of the Democratic Republic of the Congo
Butterflies of Africa